Hohentauern is a municipality in the district of Murtal in Styria, Austria.

References

Rottenmann and Wölz Tauern
Cities and towns in Murtal District